The Department of Foreign Affairs (DFA) is a department of the Government of Ireland that is responsible for promoting the interests of Ireland in the European Union and the wider world. The head of the department is the Minister for Foreign Affairs.

Departmental team
The official headquarters and ministerial offices of the department are in Iveagh House, St Stephen's Green, Dublin.  The departmental team consists of the following:
Minister for Foreign Affairs: Micheál Martin, TD
Minister of State for European Affairs: Peter Burke, TD
Minister of State for Overseas Development Aid and Diaspora: Seán Fleming, TD
Secretary General of the Department: Niall Burgess

History

The Department of Foreign Affairs was created on 22 January 1919, the second day of meeting of Dáil Éireann. By August 1921 there were eight 'official' missions abroad: France, Italy, USA, United Kingdom, Germany, Russia, Argentina and Chile. No other Commonwealth country (other than the UK) had independent representation in Washington.

Alteration of name and transfer of functions

Prominent ministers
Over the years a number of Ministers for Foreign Affairs have redefined Ireland's relationship with the United Kingdom and have allowed Ireland to join and take a prominent role in organisations such as the European Union and the United Nations. These include:

Éamon de Valera – as the longest-serving Minister for External Affairs, de Valera served as President of the Council of the League of Nations, supported the admission of the Soviet Union, redefined Ireland's relationship with the United Kingdom and followed a policy of Irish neutrality during World War II.
Seán MacBride – during MacBride's short tenure as Minister Ireland withdrew from the British Commonwealth, refused to join NATO and became a member of the Council of Europe.
Frank Aiken – as another long-serving Minister Aiken adopted where possible an independent stance for Ireland at the United Nations and other international forums such as the Council of Europe. He introduced "Aiken Plan" to the UN in an effort to combine disarmament and peace in the Middle East and received the honour of being the first minister to sign the Treaty on the Non-Proliferation of Nuclear Weapons in 1968 in Moscow.
Liam Cosgrave – as Minister from 1954 until 1957 Cosgrave took part in trade discussions and chaired the Committee of Ministers of the Council of Europe in 1955. He also successfully presided over Ireland's admittance to the United Nations, defining Irish foreign policy for decades in his first address to the General Assembly in 1956.
Patrick Hillery – during his four-year tenure Hillery negotiated Irish membership of the European Economic Community (EEC) and earned a high international profile when, in the aftermath of the killing of thirteen unarmed civilians in Derry by British Paratroopers (known as "Bloody Sunday"), he travelled to the United Nations in New York to demand UN involvement in peace-keeping on the streets of Northern Ireland.
Garret FitzGerald – became Minister for Foreign Affairs in 1973, shortly after Ireland joined the European Economic Community (EEC), now known as the European Union (EU). With a background in economics and journalism, and as a politician of great intelligence and scope, his innovative views, energy and fluency in French ensured that Ireland's first Presidency of the European Council in the second half of 1975 was a success. He travelled extensively in his role as President of the General Affairs Council of the EEC. His tenure at the Department of Foreign Affairs helped him later to achieve the leadership of the party.

Structure

The mission of the Department of Foreign Affairs is to advance Ireland's political and economic interests in the European Union and in the wider world, to promote Ireland's contribution to international peace, security and development, both through the European Union and through active participation in international organisations such as the United Nations.  The department is made up of a number of divisions and units:

Anglo-Irish Division deals with Anglo-Irish relations and Northern Ireland.
Bilateral Economic Relations Division deals with Ireland's bilateral economic relations with countries throughout the world.
Corporate Services Division is responsible for the day-to-day management of the department.
Cultural Division administers Ireland's Cultural Relations Programme.
Development Co-operation Directorate is responsible for the administration of the Irish Aid programme and for the conduct of Irish development policy.
European Union Division coordinates Ireland's approach within the European Union.
Inspection Unit evaluates the performance of the department's overseas missions and audits Headquarters divisions and offices.
Irish Abroad Unit deals with promoting services that assist emigrants and administers the financial support that the department directs to groups in the voluntary sector that are engaged in the delivery of services to Irish emigrants.
Legal Division provides the department with legal advice and has responsibilities in the negotiation of international agreements.
Consular and Passport Division is responsible for the administration of consular services and the issuing of passports to Irish citizens.
Political Division is responsible for international political issues and manages Ireland's participation in the EU's Common Foreign and Security Policy.
Press Section is responsible for informing the domestic and international media about developments in Irish foreign policy.
Protocol Division is responsible for the organisation and management of visits of VIPs to Ireland and of visits abroad by the President, as well as the administration of Ireland's obligations under the Vienna Convention.

In 2016, the Department of Foreign Affairs had 1,470 employees, 320 of which were posted overseas.

See also
Foreign relations of the Republic of Ireland
Irish passport
List of diplomatic missions of Ireland

References

External links

 
Foreign Affairs
Ireland
Foreign relations of Ireland
Ireland, Foreign Affairs
1919 establishments in Ireland